Lyudmila Georgievna Karachkina (born 3 September 1948, Rostov-on-Don) is an astronomer and discoverer of minor planets.

In 1978 she began as a staff astronomer of the Institute for Theoretical Astronomy (ITA) at Leningrad. Her research at the Crimean Astrophysical Observatory  (CrAO) then focused on astrometry and photometry of minor planets. The Minor Planet Center credits her with the discovery of 130 minor planets, including the Amor asteroid 5324 Lyapunov and the Trojan asteroid 3063 Makhaon. In 2004, she received a Ph.D. in astronomy from Odessa I. I. Mechnikov National University.

Lyudmila Karachkina has two daughters, Maria and Renata. The inner main-belt asteroid 8019 Karachkina, discovered by German astronomers Lutz D. Schmadel and Freimut Börngen at Tautenburg on 14 October 1990, was named in her honor. On 23 November 1999, the minor planet 8089 Yukar was named after her husband, Yurij Vasil'evicht Karachkin (b. 1940), a physics teacher at CrAO's school.().

List of discovered minor planets

See also 
 Tamara Smirnova, astronomer at ITA

References 
 

1948 births
20th-century Russian astronomers
21st-century Russian astronomers
Discoverers of asteroids

Living people
Scientists from Rostov-on-Don
Soviet astronomers
Ukrainian astronomers
Women astronomers
20th-century women scientists
21st-century women scientists